The Hāpuku River begins in the Seaward Kaikōura Range of New Zealand and flows south-east to enter the South Pacific at Hapuka, between Clarence and Kaikōura. The name comes from the Māori word hāpuku or hāpuka, a deep-water marine fish. Its main tributary is the Puhi Puhi River.

Whilst other rivers were affected by serious flooding in 1953, the Hāpuku rose only  at the railway bridge. Presumably this was due to the short catchment, the tectonic uplift of its headwaters and the width of the braided river bed, which is a source of railway ballast. However, an 1868 flood had more of an impact upstream, leaving a  bank and a 1941 flood damaged the railway.

Wildlife associated with the area include black-eyed geckos, found near the headwaters of the north branch Hāpuku River, and bluff wetas. Banded dotterels breed in the Hāpuku. Introduced species include red deer, goats (kept at low levels by culling), pigs and chamois.

There were two DoC huts in the valley; Hapuku Hut and Barratts Bivvy, linked by walking tracks. However, a slip triggered by the 2016 Kaikōura earthquake blocked the river, with water building up behind the slip and destroying Barratts Hut and Bivvy.

Hapuka railway station was open from 13 March 1944 to 29 March 1981. A passing loop and ballast siding remain.

See also
 List of rivers of New Zealand

References

External links 
 Google Street View from SH1 bridge
 1923 flood damage to road bridge
 1940 views of railway bridge construction  
 Aerial view of river mouth
 Map of 2016 earthquake slip and photo of the slip and lake

Kaikōura District
Rivers of Canterbury, New Zealand
Rivers of New Zealand